The Leonardo is a 55-floor mixed-use property development in Sandton, Johannesburg, South Africa. The building is built at 75 Maude Street, approximately 100 metres from the Johannesburg Stock Exchange.

The development includes street level shops as well as an above ground podium, where a swimming pool, restaurant and several other facilities are located. The facilities are open to public use, and can be booked through Legacy Hotels and Resorts.

It has been announced that the 2100 square metre, 3 floor penthouse apartment will go on the market for R 180 million, which, if sold, will make this the most expensive sectional title property ever sold in South Africa. The entire structure cost R 2 billion and consists of 200 apartments and 11 floors of commercial office.

The design has changed significantly since it was announced and was originally scheduled to be designed by AMA architect firm and be completed by 2010.

On 17 November 2015, the Leonardo began construction. The completion of the Mohammed VI Tower in Rabat, Morocco in 2023 has demoted the Leonardo to the continent's third tallest building.

See also
 List of tallest buildings and structures in South Africa
 List of tallest buildings in Africa

References

Skyscrapers in Johannesburg